Cheuang Sombounkhanh (born 5 March 1955 – died 17 May 2014) was a Laotian politician. He was the governor of Bank of the Lao P.D.R. from 1997 to 1999.

From 2010 until his death, he had worked as a Minister to the Office of the Prime Minister. At the time of his death in a plane crash on 17 May 2014, he was a member of the Secretariat of the Central Committee of the Lao People's Revolutionary Party.

References

Governors of the Bank of the Lao P.D.R.
Government ministers of Laos
1953 births
2014 deaths
Members of the 8th Central Committee of the Lao People's Revolutionary Party
Members of the 9th Central Committee of the Lao People's Revolutionary Party
Members of the 9th Secretariat of the Lao People's Revolutionary Party
Lao People's Revolutionary Party politicians
Victims of aviation accidents or incidents in Laos